Henry Prempeh may refer to:

 Henry K. Prempeh (born 1912), Ghanaian judge
 Henry Kwasi Prempeh, professor of Law